The river Loimijoki is a river in Finland and the longest tributary of the river Kokemäenjoki. The river originates at the lake Pyhäjärvi in Tammela and joins the river Kokemäenjoki in Huittinen. The river has several dams at Forssa, Jokioinen and Loimaa.

The Loimijoki river runs through the most fertile lands of Finland making its water  relatively muddy. The river was badly polluted by sewage of industry and population centers along the river, but since the 1980s the river has been starting to recover and currently the river sees also recreational use like fishing and water sports.

References 

Rivers of Finland
Kokemäenjoki basin
Forssa
Jokioinen
Loimaa
Tammela, Finland
Landforms of Southwest Finland
Landforms of Kanta-Häme